FC Iskra Smolensk was a Russian football team from Smolensk. It played professionally in 1937 and 1960 to 1994. In 1995 it merged with FC Kristall Smolensk. They played on the second-highest level in the Soviet First League in 1960–1962 and in 1980–1986. Their best result there was 7th place in 1981.

Team name history
 1937: DKA Smolensk
 1938–1959: FC Dynamo Smolensk
 1960: FC Tekstilshchik Smolensk
 1961–1964: FC Spartak Smolensk
 1965–1995: FC Iskra Smolensk

External links
  Team history at KLISF

Association football clubs established in 1937
Association football clubs disestablished in 1995
Defunct football clubs in Russia
Sport in Smolensk
1937 establishments in Russia
1995 disestablishments in Russia